Wesley Neymour (born 1 September 1988 from Central Andros is a Bahamian sprinter. He was selected to be a part of the 2012 Summer Olympics as a reserve but did not compete.

Personal bests
200 m: 21.43 s (wind: +1.4 m/s) –  Nassau, 14 May 2011
400 m: 45.54 s –  Freeport, 22 June 2013
800 m: 1:50.56 s –  Coral Gables, Florida, 16 April 2011

Achievements

1: Did not show in the final.
2: Disqualified in the final.

References

External links
Tilastopaja biography
  

1988 births
Living people
Bahamian male sprinters
Sportspeople from Nassau, Bahamas
Athletes (track and field) at the 2011 Pan American Games
Pan American Games competitors for the Bahamas